The 2014 season was Stjarnan's 12th season in Úrvalsdeild and their 6th consecutive season.

Rúnar Páll Sigmundsson took over as head-coach on 23 October following the departure of Logi Ólafsson. This was Rúnar's first managerial job in Úrvalsdeild.

On 4 October Stjarnan won their first ever Úrvalsdeild title after winning FH in the final round. Stjarnan went through the season unbeaten and matched the record for points set by KR in 2013.

2014 season was Stjarnan's first season in Europe, playing in the Europa League Qualification. Stjarnan went through to the play-off round where they were defeated by Inter Milan.

Stjarnan were eliminated from both cup competitions in the knockout stages. Going out in the 8th-finals of Lengjubikar against eventual winners FH and in the 16th-finals of Borgunarbikar against Þróttur R.

First Team

Transfers in

Transfers out

Loans Out

Pre-season

Fótbolti.net Cup
Stjarnan took part in the Fótbolti.net cup, a pre-season tournament for clubs outside of Reykjavík, in January and won the tournament after a final against FH.
Stjarnan were drawn in Group 2 with Haukar, ÍBV and ÍA. They topped the group with six points, two wins and a defeat, and went through to the final against FH which they won 3–1 with two goals from Halldór Orri and one from Heiðar Ægisson.

Lengjubikarinn
Stjarnan were drawn in group 3 in the Icelandic league cup, Lengjubikarinn, with Víkingur R, ÍBV, Valur, Selfoss, KV, Víkingur Ó and Haukar. They finished top of the group with 17 points, 5 wins and 2 draws. In the quarter finals Stjarnan were drawn against FH and lost the game 2–1, Veigar Páll scored Stjarnan's only goal.

Matches

Borgunarbikarinn
Stjarnan entered Borgunarbikarinn in the 32nd-finals where they were drawn against Selfoss. Stjarnan won the match convincingly 6–0. In the next round they were eliminated by Þróttur R 1–0.

Matches

Úrvalsdeild

Table

Matches

Summary of Results

Points breakdown
 Points at home: 25
 Points away from home: 27
 6 Points: ÍBV, Fylkir, Þór, KR, Fram
 4 Points: Valur, Keflavík, Fjölnir, FH
 3 Points: Víkingur R
 2 Points: Breiðablik

Europa League
Stjarnan took part in their first ever Europa League Qualification in 2014. They entered the qualification in the first round where they were drawn against the Welsh team Bangor City. Stjarnan won the two legged tie 8–0 and went on to the second round. They met the Scottish team Motherwell in the second round. After coming from 2–0 down in the first leg to earn a 2–2 draw Stjarnan won the second leg 3–2 after an extra-time wonder goal from Atli Jóhannsson. In the third round Rolf Toft scored the only goal over the 180 minutes against Lech Poznan to put Stjarnan through 1–0 on aggregate. Stjarnan were drawn against the Italian team Inter Milan in the play-off round. Stjarnan were unable to maintain their good form in the Europa League and lost the tie 9–0 on aggregate, 3–0 at home and 6–0 in Milan.

Matches

Statistics

Appearances
Includes all competitive matches; Úrvalsdeild, Borgunarbikar, Lengjubikar and Europa League.

Numbers in parentheses are sub appearances.

Goal scorers
Includes all competitive matches; Úrvalsdeild, Borgunarbikar, Lengjubikar and Europa League.
{| class="wikitable sortable" style="font-size: 95%; text-align: center;"
|-
!width="7%"|No.
!width="7%"|Pos.
!width="7%"|Nation
!width="20%"|Name
!Úrvalsdeild
!Borgunarbikar
!Lengjubikar
!Europa League
!Total
|-
| 17
| FW
| 
| Ólafur Karl Finsen
| 11
| 2
| 0 
| 5
|18 
|-
| 24
| FW
| 
| Rolf Toft
| 6
| 0
| 0 
| 2
|8 
|-
| 19
| FW
| 
| Jeppe Hansen
| 6
| 0
| 0 
| 0
|6 
|-
| 11
| MF
| 
| Arnar Már Björgvinsson
| 6
| 0
| 3 
| 3
|12 
|-
| 10
| FW
| 
| Veigar Páll Gunnarsson
| 6
| 0
| 6 
| 1
|13 
|-
| 8
| MF
| 
| Pablo Punyed
| 2
| 0
| 0 
| 0
|2 
|-
| 4
| DF
| 
| Niclas Vemmelund
| 2
| 0
| 0
| 0
|2 
|-
| 27
| FW
| 
| Garðar Jóhannsson
| 2
| 0
| 0
| 0
|2 
|-
| 21
| DF
| 
| Baldvin Sturluson
| 0
| 2
| 1
| 0
|3 
|-
| 21
| FW
| 
| Atli Freyr Ottesen Pálsson
| 0
| 1
| 0
| 0
|1 
|-
| 10
| MF
| 
| Halldór Orri Björnsson
| 0
| 0
| 1
| 0
|1 
|-
| 12
| MF
| 
| Heiðar Ægisson
| 0
| 0
| 3
| 0
|3 
|-
| 18
| FW
| 
| Jón Arnar Barðdal
| 0
| 0
| 2
| 0
|3 
|-
| 23
| FW
| 
| Snorri Páll Blöndal
| 0
| 0
| 1
| 0
|1 
|-
| 16
| MF
| 
| Þorri Geir Rúnarsson
| 0
| 0
| 1
| 0
|1 
|-
| 7
| MF
| 
| Atli Jóhannsson
| 0
| 0
| 0
| 2
|2 
|-
| 29
| DF
| 
| Martin Rauschenberg
| 0
| 0
| 0
| 1
|1 
|-
| colspan=4 | Own Goals
| 1
| 1
| 1
| 0
|3 
|-
|- bgcolor="F1F1F1" 
| colspan=4 | TOTAL
| 42
| 6
| 20
| 14
|82 
|-

Disciplinary record
Includes all competitive matches; Úrvalsdeild, Borgunarbikar, Lengjubikar and Europa League.

Squad Stats
Includes all competitive matches; Úrvalsdeild, Borgunarbikar, Lengjubikar and Europa League.
{|class="wikitable" style="text-align: center;"
|-
!
! style="width:70px;"|Úrvalsdeild
! style="width:70px;"|Borgunarbikar
! style="width:70px;"|Lengjubikar
! style="width:70px;"|Europa League
! style="width:70px;"|Total
|-
|align=left|Games played       || 22 || 2 || 8 || 8 || 40
|-
|align=left|Games won          || 15 || 1 || 5 || 4 || 25
|-
|align=left|Games drawn        || 7 || 0 || 2 || 2 || 11
|-
|align=left|Games lost         || 0 || 1 || 1 || 2 || 4
|-
|align=left|Goals scored       || 42 || 6 || 19 || 14 || 81
|-
|align=left|Goals conceded     || 21 || 1 || 8 || 13 || 43
|-
|align=left|Clean sheets       || 7 || 1 || 3 || 4 || 15
|-
|align=left|Yellow cards       || 31 || 1 || 7 || 7 || 46
|-
|align=left|Red cards          || 4 || 0 || 1 || 0 || 5
|-

References

2014 in Icelandic football